Tim Hanley (born March 27, 1960) is an American soccer coach and former player who currently serves as an assistant coach for Columbus Crew. During his playing career, he played in the North American Soccer League and Europe.

Player

Youth
Hanley grew up in Los Altos, California and began playing soccer in 1974.  He was fourteen at the time.  In his words, "I played one half in the field, hated it and moved into nets until I retired from the professional ranks ten years later."  Hanley graduated from Los Altos High School in 1978 and entered Foothill College, a two-year community college in Los Altos Hills.  Although a junior college, Foothill, at the time boasted one of the best college teams in California.  In 1980, he trained briefly with Blackburn F.C., playing one reserve game, and with Blackpool F.C.  After the fall 1980 collegiate season, Hanley decided against transferring to an NCAA college in favor of turning professional.

Professional
When Hanley turned professional, he had several options.  The San Francisco Fog of Major Indoor Soccer League and the Golden Gate Gales of the American Soccer League both drafted him.  However, he signed with the Tampa Bay Rowdies for the 1980–81 NASL Indoor season.  In 1981, San Jose Earthquakes starting goalkeeper Mike Hewitt broke his thumb.  The team quickly moved to sign Hanley as a backup, but he ended up playing several games during the 1981 season.  In 1982, he  moved to Hibernian F.C. of the Scottish Football League.  At the time, American players found it nearly impossible to gain contracts with European teams.  As a result, Hanley played for Hibernian "on trial".  The team paid for his lodging, meals and provided him with a small cash salary.  In 1983, he returned to the Earthquakes where he played the last two seasons of the NASL.  Following the collapse of the league in 1984, he moved to Servette F.C. in the Swiss First Division.  Once again, he found himself paid on a cash basis without a contract.  With a wife to support, he elected to retire from playing professionally and turn to coaching. Former NFL-great John Brodie was his father-in-law.

Coach
In 1985, Hanley began his career as a goalkeeper coach.  He served in that capacity in the A-League and Premier Development League for teams including the, California Jaguars and Silicon Valley Ambassadors.  In 1997, Hanley was hired as the goalkeeper coach for the San Jose Clash of Major League Soccer.  He remained with the team every year, except 2000, through its name change in 1999 to the San Jose Earthquakes and its move in 2006 to Houston where it became the Houston Dynamo. In July 2006, he left the Houston Dynamo to move to the Los Angeles Galaxy.  He was released from the team in August 2007.  In 2002, Stanford University hired Hanley as the goalkeeper coach for its men's soccer team.  He has also held positions with several northern Californian youth clubs such as: The Stanford Quake and Palo Alto Blue 93.  Hanley was re-hired by the Dynamo as the goalkeeper coach at the beginning of the 2009 season. He rejoined San Jose for the 2014 season and stayed until he was let go by the club on 20 November 2017. He was the goalkeeper coach in 2018 for Philadelphia Union.

References

External links
Tim Hanley's columns for centerlinesoccer.com
Stanford Cardinals profile
Tim Hanley’s NASL recollections
Tim Hanley-Houston Dynamo Profile
NASL stats

American soccer players
American expatriate soccer players
Association football goalkeepers
Foothill Owls men's soccer players
North American Soccer League (1968–1984) players
North American Soccer League (1968–1984) indoor players
Tampa Bay Rowdies (1975–1993) players
Hibernian F.C. players
San Jose Earthquakes (1974–1988) players
Servette FC players
American soccer coaches
LA Galaxy non-playing staff
Houston Dynamo FC non-playing staff
1960 births
Living people
Sportspeople from Palo Alto, California
People from Los Altos, California
Soccer players from California